John Fitzwilliam or FitzWilliam may refer to:

John Fitzwilliam (died 1562), MP for Midhurst (UK Parliament constituency)
John Fitzwilliam (divine) (died 1699)
John Fitzwilliam, 2nd Earl Fitzwilliam (1681–1728)
John Fitzwilliam (British Army officer) (1714–1789), MP for Windsor

See also
John Wentworth-FitzWilliam (1852 – 1889), British Liberal politician
John Fitzwilliam Stairs